Mike Candrea Field at Rita Hillenbrand Memorial Stadium is the softball stadium for the University of Arizona. The stadium is on-campus and can seat 2,956 people.

Hillenbrand Stadium, as it is more commonly known, was completed in 1993 and is named for the sister of the late William G. Hillenbrand (the Hillenbrand family have been long time Arizona benefactors).  With the continued success of the Arizona softball team, which has won eight national championships, thanks to Mike Candrea, remains one of the premier venues in college softball. The Wildcats led the NCAA in attendance from 2000–02, and from 2006–08.

On January 29, 2022, the university announced that, following Candrea's retirement and in agreement with the Hillenbrand family, Candrea's name would be added to the name of the stadium to honor his career.

References

Arizona Wildcats softball
College softball venues in the United States
Sports venues completed in 1993
Sports venues in Tucson, Arizona
University of Arizona
1993 establishments in Arizona